Sir John Knatchbull, 2nd Baronet (c. 1636 – 15 December 1696) was an English landowner and politician who sat in the House of Commons at various times between 1660 and 1690.

Background
Knatchbull was the eldest son of Sir Norton Knatchbull, 1st Baronet and his first wife Dorothy Westrow, daughter of Thomas Westrow. Knatchbull was educated at Trinity College, Cambridge and matriculated in 1652. He was then called to the bar by the Inner Temple in 1655.

Career
In April 1660, Knatchbull was elected Member of Parliament for New Romney together with his father until the following year. In 1685 he succeeded his father as baronet and was elected MP for Kent. He was re-elected MP for Kent in 1689 and 1690. In 1690, he was appointed Commissioner to the Lord Privy Seal, an office he held for the next two years.

Knatchbull died aged sixty and was buried in Mersham Hatch in Kent.

Family

Knatchbull married Jane Monins, daughter of Sir Edward Monins, 2nd Baronet on 17 January 1659, His sons having all predeceased him, he was succeeded in the baronetcy by his younger brother Thomas.

References

External links
 

1630s births
1696 deaths
Alumni of Trinity College, Cambridge
Baronets in the Baronetage of England
Members of the Inner Temple
John
English MPs 1660
English MPs 1685–1687
English MPs 1689–1690
English MPs 1690–1695